WSRQ, broadcasting on 1220 AM is a radio station with a format that features Oldies from the 60s, 70s, 80s. Licensed to Sarasota, Florida, the station is owned by Lake Erie College of Osteopathic Medicine, Inc..

It was announced on July 14, 2011, that WSRQ would be acquired by Florida Talk Radio, LLC.
Prior to June 29, 2018, the station was branded as The Voice of Sarasota-Manatee and featured a talk show lineup. WSRQ is the official radio station of Tampa Bay Rays baseball.

WSRQ is also carried in northern and central Sarasota County and throughout Manatee County on their 250-watt FM translator W295BH on 106.9 FM in Sarasota and in southern Sarasota County as far south as North Port on their 250-watt FM translator W237FJ on 95.9 FM in Venice.

1220 AM is a Mexican clear-channel frequency. XEB is the only Class A station on this frequency; all other stations on this frequency in the United States and Mexico must reduce power or become directional during the nighttime in order to prevent interference to the skywave signal of XEB.

WSRQ has been granted an FCC construction permit to move to a different transmitter site and decrease day power to 770 watts and night power to 15 watts.

The station, along with its translators, was sold by Florida Talk Radio to Lake Erie College of Osteopathic Medicine, Inc. effective December 10, 2018 for $520,000.

Translators

Previous logo

References

3. WSRQ Radio changing formats - https://www.heraldtribune.com/news/20180627/wsrq-radio-changing-formats-friday

External links

SRQ (AM)
1961 establishments in Florida
Radio stations established in 1961
Oldies radio stations in the United States